Alexandre von Baumgarten (1930 - 1982) was a Brazilian writer and journalist, murdered in 1982 in mysterious circumstances. He was an agent of the National Intelligence Service of Brazil (SNI), the political police of the military dictatorship. He wrote the book Yellow Cake, supposedly fiction, about uranium trafficking operation from Brazil to the Middle East.

References

1930 births
1982 deaths
Brazilian journalists
Brazilian murder victims
1982 murders in Brazil
20th-century journalists